No Turn Unstoned is a collection of "the worst ever theatrical reviews" compiled by the actress Diana Rigg. The first edition, published in the United Kingdom by Elm Tree Books in 1982 and in the United States by Doubleday, was followed by a paperback edition in 1983.

Rigg wrote to her many friends and acquaintances in the theatre and film industries and asked them to share their worst-ever reviews. She also researched theatre criticism and surviving comments from as far back as Ancient Greece. During the early 1990s, Rigg toured university campuses, reading excerpts from the book. All of the proceeds from the speaking tour, and the book itself, were donated to a theatrical charity.

See also
 Theatre criticism

References

External links
http://www.theguardian.com/stage/2014/aug/17/diana-rigg-no-turn-unstoned-review-edinburgh-festival-2014

1982 books
Theatre criticism
British non-fiction books